Death and Progress is the fourth studio album by the British heavy metal band Diamond Head, released in 1993 through Castle Music Ltd.

This was Diamond Head's first album since Canterbury, released 10 years earlier. It was co-produced, engineered and mixed by Andrew Scarth, who had previously worked for bands such as Bad Company and Foreigner. The album had a much cleaner and more polished sound than their previous three albums and featured two special guests, Tony Iommi, of Black Sabbath, and Dave Mustaine, of Megadeth, the latter also enlisting the help of his own producer Max Norman.

National Bowl incident

The reunion of Diamond Head did not last. One major contributor to the second fall of the band was during the Death and Progress tour, when Diamond Head opened for Metallica and Megadeth at the National Bowl in Milton Keynes on 5 June 1993; The Almighty was also on the bill.

During the show, Sean Harris came out dressed as the Grim Reaper, which Brian Tatler reported in the British rock magazine Classic Rock was Harris' way of saying that NWOBHM was over. They opened with their flagship song, "Am I Evil" and ended with "Helpless", both off their debut Lightning to the Nations, as they thought this would go down well with the Metallica fan base. However, Diamond Head had not been around for the majority of the previous decade and Metallica had covered both of these songs ("Am I Evil" was the B-side to "Creeping Death" and "Helpless" appeared on The $5.98 E.P. – Garage Days Re-Revisited), meaning much of the crowd believed that Diamond Head were covering Metallica songs.

In addition, their performance was considered abysmal, due to the pressure of playing live on MTV, and the fact Tatler had shingles at the time and that Diamond Head  had almost no rehearsal time prior to the gig.

Following this disastrous show, the band split up again and would not reform until 2000.

Track listing

Notes 
The tracks Wild on the Streets and I Can't Help Myself were previously released on the EP Rising Up, although it was only sold at gigs and specialist music stores.

Personnel

Diamond Head
 Sean Harris – vocals
 Brian Tatler – guitar
 Pete Vuckovic – bass, backing vocals
 Karl Wilcox – drums

Additional personnel
 Tony Iommi – guitar on track 1
 Dave Mustaine – guitar, producer and mixing on track 2
 Eddie Moohan – bass on tracks 4 and 8

Production
Andrew Scarth – producer, engineer, mixing
Brad Davis – engineer on tracks 1 and 9
Max Norman – producer and engineer on track 2
Mark Dearnley, Simon Efemey – engineers on tracks 4 and 8
Rafe McKenna – mixing on tracks 1 and 5

References

External sites
 
 
 

Diamond Head (band) albums
1993 albums
Albums produced by Max Norman
Castle Communications albums